A ryepeck (also rypeck and ripeck [Chambers Dictionary 11th edition p1367]) is a pole used to mark the ends of a punt race course.  For a description of racing in punts and the use of ryepecks, see Thames Punting Club.

Racing